The 1973 Virginia lieutenant gubernatorial election was held on November 6, 1973. Republican nominee John N. Dalton defeated Democratic nominee James Harry Michael Jr. with 53.96% of the vote.

General election

Candidates
Major party candidates
John N. Dalton (Republican), State Senator
James Harry Michael Jr. (Democratic), State Senator

Other candidate's
Flora Crater, Independent

Results

References

1973
Gubernatorial
Virginia